Astoria Boulevard is an important east-west commercial street in Astoria and East Elmhurst, Queens, New York City. It runs from 1st Street at the East River to the World's Fair Marina on Flushing Bay, where it merges with Northern Boulevard. Just before the junction of the two boulevards, there is a large two lane ramp leading to the Whitestone Expressway. Most of the traffic on Astoria Boulevard heads toward this ramp, and then onto the Expressway.  

Astoria Boulevard is the southern border of Astoria Heights, and the northern border of North Corona.

Description
In East Elmhurst, Astoria Boulevard is a wide six lane, median divided street. However, traffic is usually light on the boulevard, presumably because the boulevard runs parallel to the busier Northern Boulevard and Grand Central Parkway. During rush hours, though, this road becomes a major artery, serving as an alternate route to the Grand Central Parkway to access the Whitestone Expressway, and as a result, it frequently becomes congested. The efficient synchronization of the traffic lights minimize heavy delays, making this a popular alternate route to take instead of the Grand Central. The portion of Astoria Boulevard between roughly 31st and 78th Streets in Astoria serves as a frontage road, or service road for the Grand Central Parkway.

Between First and 31st Streets, it is a busy two lane road, with bidirectional traffic. Here most of the traffic is bound for either the Whitestone Expressway or the Grand Central Parkway. 

Astoria Boulevard is served by the New York City Subway's BMT Astoria Line at the Astoria Boulevard station, as well as the Q19, Q49 and M60 SBS bus routes.

History
The road that was to become Astoria Boulevard was authorized to be laid out in 1835, and was to run from the head of Flushing Bay on the Flushing and Newtown Turnpike to Hallett's Cove, in what is now Astoria. The Astoria and Flushing Turnpike Company was then chartered in 1840 to toll the road, with a small extension. It was still known by this name at least to 1909. However, it was more commonly known as Flushing Avenue up to the 1920s, when it was renamed Astoria Boulevard.

References

Astoria, Queens
East Elmhurst, Queens
Streets in Queens, New York